Veronika "Niki" Boyd (born January 3, 1993 in New Westminster, British Columbia) is a Canadian baseball player. She is a member of the Canada women's national baseball team which won a silver medal at the 2015 Pan American Games.

Playing career

Softball
Boyd competed in softball at Douglas College. She helped the program capture a silver medal in the 2014 Northwest Athletic Conference Championships.

Baseball
Boyd has competed in two IBAF Women's World Cups (2012, 2014).

Awards and honours
 2013 Jimmy Rattlesnake Award

Personal
Her birth name is Veronika and she has four older brothers.

References

1993 births
Sportspeople from New Westminster
Canadian female baseball players
Baseball people from British Columbia
Living people
Baseball players at the 2015 Pan American Games
Pan American Games silver medalists for Canada
Pan American Games medalists in baseball
Medalists at the 2015 Pan American Games